Ruby Smith (August 24, 1903 – March 24, 1977) was an American classic female blues singer. She was a niece, by marriage, of the better-known Bessie Smith, who discouraged Ruby from pursuing a recording career. Nevertheless, following Bessie's death in 1937, Ruby recorded twenty-one sides between 1938 and 1947. She is also known for her candid observations on her own and Bessie's lifestyle.

Biography
She was born Ruby Walker in New York City.
 
She met Bessie Smith, her aunt (by marriage), in Philadelphia. After Bessie's debut recording, in February 1923, Ruby joined her on tour in 1924. Ruby assisted off-stage with costume changes and provided entertainment during intermissions by dancing. Ruby's thoughts of a career as a singer were initially thwarted in 1926 at Bessie's insistence, but they continued traveling together on tour. In Atlanta, Georgia, Ruby spent a night in jail after being caught bringing moonshine for her aunt to consume. In 1927, Ruby was part of the female entourage led by Bessie to the "buffet flats" in Detroit, Michigan. A lengthy recorded interview she gave to Chris Albertson contained references to this time and others, and the recording became part of Bessie Smith's The Complete Recordings, Vol. 5: The Final Chapter box set. Of a particularly "open house" sex show, Smith said, "People used to pay good just to go in there and see him do his act."

Later Jack Gee, who was married to Bessie at the time, once implored Ruby to take the musical stage after her aunt had walked out in Indianapolis, Indiana. However, the deception did not last long, and in the event Bessie died in 1937. Shortly afterwards, Ruby adopted the stage name Ruby Smith, and less than a year later she recorded six tracks, including a cover version of Bessie's "Send Me to the 'Lectric Chair Blues". At the same session she recorded her version of "Draggin' My Heart Around", by Alex Hill.

In March 1939, Smith recorded, under the musical direction of James P. Johnson, "He's Mine, All Mine" and "Backwater Blues" (the latter written by Bessie Smith and Johnson). In December 1941, backed by an ensemble led by Sammy Price, she recorded two more tracks, "Why Don't You Love Me Anymore?" and her own song "Harlem Gin Blues". Her final recording sessions took place in August 1946 and January 1947, when she was backed by Gene Sedric's band.

Smith died on March 24, 1977, in Anaheim, California, at the age of 73.

Her recorded work has been issued on several compilation albums, including Jazzin' the Blues (1943–1952), released by Document Records in 2000.

Recordings

See also
List of classic female blues singers

References

1903 births
1977 deaths
American blues singers
Classic female blues singers
Singers from New York (state)
Songwriters from New York (state)
Urban blues musicians
20th-century American singers
20th-century American women singers